Alphadelphia Association was a Fourierist commune established near Galesburg, Michigan, in Comstock township, Kalamazoo County, Michigan, in 1844. A German, Dr. H. R. Schetterly, was the leader. Three thousand acres (12 km2) of land were purchased, and a large mansion was built. At one time probably 300 members were admitted. The common property was valued at $43,897.21 in 1846. It was disbanded in 1848.

Two of the primary founders were the Rev. Richard Thornton, and the Rev. James Billings, both Universalist preachers. They published the Association's paper, the Alphadelphia Tocsin, from 1844 to 1846.

References

Kalamazoo County, Michigan
Intentional communities in the United States
Populated places established in 1844
1844 establishments in Michigan
1848 disestablishments in Michigan